Miguel Ángel Casanova Díaz (born October 24, 1980) is a Mexican football manager and former player. He was born in Tuxtla Gutiérrez. He is the brother of the former professional football player, Leonardo Casanova.

During his career he played in the clubs Jaguares de Chiapas, Jaguares de Tapachula, Petroleros de Salamanca, Tiburones Rojos de Coatzacoalcos, Albinegros de Orizaba, Irapuato, La Piedad and Halcones FC. His career as a footballer lasted from 2002 to 2012. 

In 2013 he began his work in the technical direction when he was appointed as an assistant to Atlético Chiapas, the reserve team of Chiapas F.C. that played in the Third Division.  In 2018 he was appointed as manager of Ocelotes UNACH, which meant his first position as coach of a football team. However, in 2019 the UNACH team merged with Cafetaleros de Chiapas, for which Casanova went to Cafetaleros on he become the technical assistant of the club.

In 2020 the main team of Cafetaleros de Chiapas was moved to Cancún and renamed Cancún F.C., so the reserve team from Cafetaleros became the club's main squad, after this, Casanova was appointed as manager of the team to continue with the project in Chiapas, but playing in the Liga Premier.

References

Living people
1980 births
Association football defenders
Salamanca F.C. footballers
Chiapas F.C. footballers
Irapuato F.C. footballers
Liga MX players
Ascenso MX players
Mexican football managers
Footballers from Chiapas
Mexican footballers
People from Tuxtla Gutiérrez